Xanadu is a 1980 American musical fantasy film written by Richard Christian Danus and Marc Reid Rubel, and directed by Robert Greenwald. The film stars Olivia Newton-John, Michael Beck and Gene Kelly in his final film role. It features music by Newton-John, Electric Light Orchestra, Cliff Richard, and the Tubes. The title is a reference to the nightclub in the film, which takes its name from Xanadu, the summer capital of Kublai Khan's Yuan Dynasty in China. This city appears in Kubla Khan by Samuel Taylor Coleridge, an 1816 poem that is quoted in the film.

Xanadu was released in the United States on August 8, 1980, by Universal Pictures. A box office disappointment, it earned negative critical reviews and was an inspiration (along with Can't Stop the Music) for the creation of the Golden Raspberry Awards to recognize the worst films of the year. Despite the lackluster performance of the film, the soundtrack album became a huge commercial success around the world, and was certified double platinum in the United States. The song "Magic" was a U.S. number one hit for Newton-John, and the title track (by Newton-John and Electric Light Orchestra) reached number one in the United Kingdom and several other countries around the world. The film has since become a cult classic for the way it mixes the storyline from an old-fashioned 1940s fantasy with modern aesthetics featuring late 1970s and early 1980s rock and pop music on the soundtrack as well as for fans of Newton-John.

Plot 
Sonny Malone is a struggling artist in Los Angeles attempting to make a living by freelancing. He rips up one of his failed sketches and throws it into the wind. It hits a mural of nine sisters and brings them to life. The sisters fly across Earth, but one of them roller skates through town and collides with Sonny. She kisses him before skating away, leaving him confused.

Having returned to his old job of painting album cover reproductions at AirFlo Records, Sonny is tasked with painting an album cover reproduction for a group called the 9 Sisters. The cover shows the mysterious woman Sonny encountered earlier roller skating in front of an abandoned art deco auditorium. The photographer notes that the woman was not supposed to be on the cover, but suddenly appeared in a few of the shots. Sonny eventually traces her across town to the aforementioned auditorium, where she introduces herself as Kira. The two of them fall in love, though Kira refuses to tell Sonny anything about herself.

Sonny also meets and befriends Danny McGuire, a former big band orchestra leader turned construction mogul. He was once romantically involved with a singer in the 1940s who resembled Kira; her departure resulted in his own loss of creative passion. Kira encourages Sonny and Danny to open a nightclub at the auditorium called Xanadu, and the two begin working on the project as partners. All the while, Sonny and Kira begin to develop romantic feelings for each other. The night before the club's opening, however, Kira confesses to Sonny that she is actually Terpsichore, one of the Nine Muses of Olympus. She was sent to inspire the creation of Xanadu, but she cannot stay despite their mutual feelings. Sonny gets upset at the revelation, and Kira departs Earth having fulfilled her duty.

Danny tells Sonny to keep pursuing Kira, encouraging Sonny not to give up on his ambitions like he did after his own muse left him. Sonny manages to enter Kira's home by roller skating into the Muses' mural. Inside the realm of the gods, Kira's father Zeus denies Sonny's plea to let Kira come back to Earth, and despite Kira's mother Mnemosyne interceding for Sonny and Kira, Zeus sends Sonny back to Earth. Kira professes her feelings for Sonny, and Zeus ultimately relents, allowing her to be with Sonny for "a moment, or maybe forever." Kira and the Muses perform at the Xanadu grand opening before returning to their realm. Sonny is initially saddened by their departure, but upon seeing a waitress who looks exactly like Kira, he stops her and asks to talk.

Cast 
 Olivia Newton-John as Kira (Terpsichore)
 Michael Beck as Sonny Malone
 Gene Kelly as Danny McGuire
 Matt Lattanzi as young Danny McGuire
 James Sloyan as Simpson
 Dimitra Arliss as Helen
 Katie Hanley as Sandra
 Fred McCarren as Richie
 Ren Woods as Jo
 Melvin Jones as Big Al
 Ira Newborn as 1940s Band Leader
 Jo Ann Harris as 1940s Singer
 Wilfrid Hyde-White as Heavenly Voice #1 (Zeus)
 Coral Browne as Heavenly Voice #2 (Mnemosyne)
 Darcel Wynne, Deborah Jennsen, Alexander Cole, Adolfo Quinones, Matt Lattanzi, and Miranda Garrison as dancers

The Muses
 Sandahl Bergman
 Lynn Latham
 Melinda Phelps
 Cherise Bate
 Juliette Marshall
 Marilyn Tokuda
 Yvette Van Voorhees
 Teri Beckerman

Members of the Tubes
 John "Fee" Waybill
 Rick Anderson
 Michael Cotten
 Prairie Prince
 Bill Spooner
 Roger Steen
 Vince Welnick
 Re Styles

Musical numbers 

The album grouped Olivia Newton-John (ONJ) and ELO onto separate sides of the album, and some tunes were excluded from the album. The following is the actual order in the film:
 Instrumental medley of "Whenever You're Away from Me" and "Xanadu", over first part of opening credits
 "Whenever You're Away from Me" excerpt: Danny plays the clarinet on the beach at the break of dawn 
 Instrumental underscoring of "Xanadu" with Sonny drawing and painting 
 Extended intro to "I'm Alive" (only a portion of which is in the soundtrack album)
 "I'm Alive" (ELO) from the film's album soundtrack as the Muses from the wall mural come to life
 "Whenever You're Away from Me" excerpt with Danny again playing the clarinet at the beach  
 "Magic" (ONJ) from the soundtrack: Kira and Sonny have their first conversation while Kira is roller skating in the dark auditorium
 "You Made Me Love You" (ONJ) (non-soundtrack LP track released as B-side of the "Suddenly" single): Featured on Glenn Miller record played by Danny in the ballroom of his home
 "Whenever You're Away from Me" (Gene Kelly and ONJ) from the soundtrack with Danny and Kira singing and dancing in the ballroom. This song was heavily influenced by Frank Sinatra. According to the DVD special, this was the last sequence filmed.
 "Suddenly" (ONJ duet with Cliff Richard) from the soundtrack as Kira and Sonny roller-dance through the props in the recording studio
 "Dancin'" (ONJ duet with the Tubes) from the soundtrack: In the auditorium, Danny and Sonny imagine differing visions of their ideal club. Sonny's hard-rocking glam band and Danny's Big Band female trio lip-synching to ONJ's self-harmony musically and physically merge into a unified whole, leading to agreement on "Xanadu" as the name of the club
 "Don't Walk Away" (ELO) from the soundtrack during a romantic animated sequence featuring Sonny and Kira as fish and birds (animation by Don Bluth).
 "All Over the World" (ELO) from the soundtrack: In the "franchised glitz dealer" store (the Beverly Hills Fiorucci), Danny runs through various dance steps and does some rollerskating as he tries on different outfits
 "The Fall" (ELO) from the soundtrack: Sonny finds the Muse wall mural and roller-skates through its portal entrance into Xanadu to find Kira
 "Suspended in Time" (ONJ) from the soundtrack: After Zeus sends Sonny home, a dejected Kira sings about her love for Sonny
 "Drum Dreams" (ELO) (non-soundtrack LP track released as B-side of the "I'm Alive" and "All Over the World" singles) begins the Xanadu opening night roller disco sequence, with Danny leading the group on skates
 "Xanadu" (ONJ and ELO): Kira sings and is reunited with Sonny
 "Fool Country" (ONJ) (non-soundtrack LP track released as B-side of the "Magic" single): Kira sings and dances in various costumes with the other eight Muses backing her up
 "Xanadu" reprise: Kira sings and dances with the other eight Muses. They disappear into the heavens with Kira following a moment later
 "Magic" (ONJ) reprise from the soundtrack as Sonny stares at the empty revolving dance floor, now disillusioned that Kira is gone
 Instrumental riff from "Xanadu": Kira (as a Xanadu waitress) and Sonny become silhouetted; "The End"
 "Xanadu" (ONJ and ELO) short version over closing credits

Themes 
The plot of the film Down to Earth (1947) was used as the basis for Xanadu. In the film, Rita Hayworth played Terpsichore, and Larry Parks played a producer of stage plays.

Kelly's character Danny McGuire previously appeared in the film Cover Girl which, like Down to Earth, also starred Rita Hayworth.

Production 

The film was originally conceived as a relatively low-budget roller disco picture. As a number of prominent performers joined the production, it evolved into a much larger project, while retaining rollerskating as a recurring theme, especially in the final scenes of the club's opening night.

Earlier versions of the story established that Sonny was the artist who created the mural from which the nine goddess sisters emerge. This provided a much stronger explanation for the muses' interest in helping him achieve artistic success. However, continual rewrites and editing during production caused this plot point to be lost, except for one line spoken by Sonny as he laments his failure as a freelance artist; "I paint his van...I paint somebody else's mural...". This plot point was recycled and used in the stage adaptation of the film. The Marvel Comics adaptation published as Marvel Super Special #17 retained the more strongly emphasized connection between Sonny and the painting.

Danny McGuire, who appeared in Cover Girl, also appears in Xanadu. The film was Gene Kelly's final film role, except for compilation films of the That's Entertainment! series. Kenny Ortega and Jerry Trent served as choreographers.

The Pan-Pacific Auditorium in Los Angeles was used for exterior shots of the nightclub. Xanadu's nightclub interior was built on Stage 4 of the Hollywood Center Studios (1040 N. Las Palmas Avenue, Hollywood) beginning in 1979. Sonny refers to the Auditorium as "a dump", which was a fair characterization of the Pan-Pacific by then. Danny jokes that "they used to have wrestling here", which was a true statement about the Auditorium. The building would be consumed by fire a decade later.

"The main trouble was the script,” recalled Newton-John later. “We had so many story changes during filming.”

Reception

Critical
Universal cancelled press screenings of Xanadu, suggesting that they were not confident in the film and it went on to receive negative reviews. Variety called it "a stupendously bad film whose only salvage is the music". Roger Ebert gave the film two stars out of a possible four, describing the film as "a mushy and limp musical fantasy" with a confused story, redeemed only by Newton-John's "high spirits" and several strong scenes from Kelly. Moreover, Ebert criticized the choreography, saying "the dance numbers in this movie do not seem to have been conceived for film." He noted that mass dance scenes were not photographed well by cinematographer Victor J. Kemper, who shot at eye level and failed to pick up the larger patterns of dancers, with dancers in the background muddying the movement of the foreground.

With a combination of contemporaneous and modern reviews, Xanadu today holds a "Rotten" rating of 30% from Rotten Tomatoes, based on 43 reviews, and the consensus states "Not even spandex and over-the-top musical numbers can save Xanadu from questionable acting, unimpressive effects, and a story unencumbered by logic." The German television show Die schlechtesten Filme aller Zeiten (in English The worst movies of all time), in which the hosts Oliver Kalkofe and Peter Rütten present a bad movie in each episode, featured the movie in its third season. Janet Maslin wrote in her review "Like The Wiz...Xanadu is desperately stylish without having any real style."

A double feature of Xanadu and another musical released at about the same time, Can't Stop the Music, inspired John J.B. Wilson to create the Golden Raspberry Awards (or Razzies), an annual event "dishonoring" what is considered the worst in cinema for a given year. Robert Greenwald won the first Golden Raspberry Award for Worst Director, and the film was nominated for six other awards.

Box Office
The movie was a box office failure, making only $23 million against a reported $20 million budget (to be profitable, movies must gross at least twice their budgets after all costs are taken into account). The soundtrack album (UK #2, US #4), however, was a major hit. It was certified Double Platinum in the US and Gold in the UK, and also spent one week atop the Cashbox and Record World Pop Albums charts. The soundtrack contained five Top 20 singles:
 "Magic"Olivia Newton-John (#1 Pop (4 weeks), #1 AC (5 weeks), certified gold)
 "Xanadu"Olivia Newton-John/Electric Light Orchestra (#8 Pop (1 week), #2 AC (1 week), #1 UK (2 weeks))
 "All Over the World"Electric Light Orchestra (#13 Pop (1 week), #45 AC (1 week))
 "I'm Alive"Electric Light Orchestra (#16 Pop (1 week), #48 AC (1 week), certified gold)
 "Suddenly"Olivia Newton-John/Cliff Richard (#20 Pop (1 week), #4 AC (1 week))

Awards and nominations

Cult following
Over the years, the film has developed something of a cult audience.

Douglas Carter Beane, who wrote the book for the musical based on the film, later called Xandadu "what happens when you let straight men near the musical... I blame cocaine. It’s like people say, ‘When you hear Ray Charles play, you can hear the heroin’? When you watch Xanadu, you can see the cocaine up on the screen.”

In 2001 there was an unauthorised stage adaptation Xanadu Live! in Los Angeles where actors delivered the movie’s dialogue and lip-synched to the songs.

Home media 
Xanadu was re-released on DVD on June 24, 2008. The "Magical Music Edition" features a "Going Back to Xanadu" featurette, the film's trailer and a photo gallery. A bonus music CD with the soundtrack album was included. The CD was the film's standard soundtrack album, i.e. with no extras such as omitted tracks.

The film was officially released on Blu-ray on March 8, 2016. In addition, it was released in Digital HD for download and streaming.

Stage musical 

A $5 million Broadway musical adaptation of the same name began previews on May 23, 2007, and opened (with Newton-John and songwriter John Farrar in attendance) on July 10, 2007 starring Kerry Butler as Kira, Cheyenne Jackson as Sonny, and Tony Roberts as Danny. In the musical, Kira is the Muse Clio, not Terpsichore. Jackie Hoffman and Mary Testa co-starred (in a plot twist new to the Broadway version) as "evil" Muse sisters. The show, which humorously parodied the plot of the film, was a surprise hit, receiving praise for its satirical approach, and was nominated for several Tony Awards. The original cast recording was released December 2007. The Broadway production closed on September 28, 2008 after 49 previews and 512 performances. A successful national tour followed.

See also 
 Muses in popular culture
 Roller Boogie, a 1979 American musical roller-disco film.
 Skatetown, U.S.A., a 1979 film to also capitalize on the fad of the roller-disco.

References

External links 
 
 
 
 
 

1980 films
1980 directorial debut films
1980s English-language films
1980s musical fantasy films
1980s romantic fantasy films
1980s romantic musical films
American films with live action and animation
American musical fantasy films
American romantic fantasy films
American romantic musical films
Films adapted into comics
Films adapted into plays
Films based on classical mythology
Films directed by Robert Greenwald
Films produced by Joel Silver
Films produced by Lawrence Gordon
Films scored by Barry De Vorzon
Films set in Los Angeles
Films shot in Los Angeles
Golden Raspberry Award winning films
Universal Pictures films
1980s American films